The men's javelin throw at the 2022 European Athletics Championships took place at the Olympiastadion on 19 and 21 August.

Records

Schedule

Results

Qualification

Qualification: 83.50 m (Q) or best 12 performers (q)

Final

References

Javelin Throw
Javelin throw at the European Athletics Championships